Neal Beidleman is a mountaineer and climbing guide, known for surviving the 1996 Mount Everest disaster. He conducted numerous public talks on his experiences in that disaster, especially in regard to decision-making and team management. Beidleman's stories were also featured on the U.S. television news show Nightline. Beidleman made a return trip to Mount Everest in 2011.

Neal Beidleman was working as a guide with his co-worker and friend Scott Fischer in the spring of 1996 on Mount Everest. The disaster involved the death of Fischer and several other climbers that season.

In 2018, he summited Mount Everest with Adrian Ballinger.

He was engaged to his wife Amy Beidleman in 1994.

See also
List of Mount Everest guides

References

American mountain climbers
Mount Everest
Living people
1960 births